Steger can refer to:

People
 Aleš Šteger (born 1973), Slovene poet, writer, editor and literary critic
 Bastian Steger (born 1981), German table tennis player
 Charles W. Steger (1947–2018), American academic, president of Virginia Polytechnic Institute and State University
 Christian Steger (born 1967), Italian skeleton racer
 Harry Peyton Steger (1883–1913), American writer and editor
 Herb Steger (1902–1968), American football player, coach and official
 Jason Steger (born 1956), British-Australian journalist
 Joseph A. Steger (1937–2013), president of the University of Cincinnati, Ohio
 Manfred Steger (born 1961), Austrian-American political scientist, professor at University of Hawaii
 Maurice Steger (born 1971), Swiss recorder player and conductor
 Meritt H. Steger (1906–1998), American lawyer, General Counsel of the Navy
 Michael Steger (born 1980), American actor
 Norbert Steger (born 1944), Austrian lawyer and politician
 Petra Steger (born 1987), Austrian politician
 Will Steger (born 1944), American polar explorer and environmentalist
 William Steger (1920–2006), American judge and politician

Places
 Steger, Illinois

See also
 Steeger, a surname